Mufian (Muhian, Muhiang), or Southern Arapesh, is an Arapesh language (Torricelli) of Papua New Guinea. Dialects are Supari, Balif, Filifita (Ilahita), Iwam-Nagalemb, Nagipaem; Filifita speakers are half the population, at 6,000 in 1999. It is spoken in 36 villages, most of which are located within Bumbita-Muhian Rural LLG, East Sepik Province. It is also spoken in Supari ward of Albiges-Mablep Rural LLG.

Phonology

/ʔʷ/ is a coarticulated glottal stop with lip rounding that occurs only in final word positions.

Pronouns
Southern Arapesh pronouns are:

{| 
!  !! sg !! pl
|-
! 1incl
|  || apə
|-
! 1excl
| aeʔ || afə
|-
! 2
| inəʔ || ipə
|-
! 3m
| ənən || əmom
|-
! 3f
| əkoʔʷ || aowou
|}

Noun classes
There are 17 classes for count nouns in Mufian, plus two extra classes, i.e. proper names and place names. Noun classes are expressed in noun suffixes, adjective suffixes, and verb prefixes.

Although Southern Arapesh has more than a dozen noun classes, only four noun classes are determined by semantics, while the other noun classes are determined phonologically using the final root segment (a feature typical of the Lower Sepik languages). The four semantically determined noun classes are:

class 16: male human referents
class 8: female human referents
class 5: human referents of unspecified sex (likely diminutive, since children are also included)
class 6: human referents of unspecified sex

The membership of the other twelve classes is determined phonologically, by the final segment of the root, as in the Lower Sepik languages.

Some examples of Mufian noun classes from Alungum (1978):

There are a few irregularities in these noun classes.

External links 
 Paradisec has a collection of materials with Don Laycock (DL1) that includes Mufian materials

References

Arapesh languages
Languages of East Sepik Province